KSOU (1090 AM) is a radio station broadcasting a Spanish adult hits format. Serving the Sioux Center area in the U.S. state of Iowa, the station is licensed to Community First Broadcasting. KSOU previously carried a classic hits format and before that, a Christian Contemporary format.

1090 AM is a United States and Mexican clear-channel frequency; KSOU must leave the air from sunset to sunrise to prevent interference to the skywave signals of the Class A stations.

On February 5, 2020, KSOU changed their format from classic hits to Spanish adult hits, branded as "Sioux Ritmo".

Previous logos

References

External links

SOU (AM)
Radio stations established in 1969
1969 establishments in Iowa
Sioux Center, Iowa
SOU (AM)
Adult hits radio stations in the United States
Spanish-language radio stations in the United States